Alternate reality often refers to parallel universes in fiction, a self-contained separate world, universe or reality coexisting with the real world, which is used as a recurring plot point or setting used in fantasy and science fiction.

Alternate reality may also refer to:

Science 
 The many-worlds interpretation of quantum mechanics, which implies the existence of parallel universes
 Multiverse, a group of multiple universes

Arts and media
 Alternate history, a genre of fiction consisting of stories that are set in worlds in which historical events unfold differently from the real world
 Alternate universe (fan fiction), fiction by fan authors that deliberately alters facts of the canonical universe they are writing about

Literature
 Alternate Realities (Cherryh), a 2000 anthology of science fiction by C. J. Cherryh

Games and video games
 Alternate Reality (series), a role-playing video game series started in 1985 with two of several intended games released
 Alternate reality game, a type of cross-media game
 Virtual reality, simulated reality

Other uses
 A euphemism for "psychedelic experience"

See also
Metaverse, a collective virtual shared space
Parallel universe (disambiguation)
Separate reality (disambiguation)
Megaverse (disambiguation)
Multiverse (disambiguation)
Omniverse (disambiguation)
AR (disambiguation)
Augmented reality
Alternate facts